Gary Hamilton (born 6 October 1980) is a footballer from Northern Ireland. He is currently the player-manager for NIFL Premiership club Glenavon.

Career
Hamilton currently holds the NIFL Premiership record for the number of goals scored in a match, scoring six for Portadown against Omagh Town in October 2004.

In 2006, he moved to Glentoran, having previously played for Portadown, Raufoss IL, Rochdale and Blackburn Rovers. He gained five international caps between 2003 and 2004, having previously represented Northern Ireland at every other level.

He scored for Glentoran in the Europa League in July 2010, before moving to Glenavon on a season-long loan where he made an immediate impact, scoring nine goals in ten competitive starts winning Carling Player of the Month for December 2010.

Hamilton is a Glenavon and Everton fan.

He joined his hometown club, Glenavon, on a season-long loan for the 2010–11 season. He signed a new deal with Glentoran in August 2011.

Managerial career 
On 15 December 2011, Hamilton was appointed player-manager of Glenavon after the resignation of Marty Quinn. His first match in charge was on 17 December 2011, against Linfield at Windsor Park. Linfield won the match 1–0.

However, his first win in charge came in the very next game, as the Lurgan Blues defeated Crusaders 3–2 at Mourneview Park on 20 December 2011.

In 2014, Hamilton guided Glenavon to victory in the 2013–14 Irish Cup, the clubs first winning campaign in the tournament since 1997. He repeated this success in 2016, defeating David Healy's Linfield 2–0 in the final.

On 4 March 2021, Hamilton signed a three-year extension to his contract at Glenavon. The extension granted Hamilton to stay at the club until the end of the 2024/25 season. At the end of this year, Hamilton will overtake Terry Nicholson in becoming the second longest-serving Manager at Glenavon FC since the 50's. At the end of his contract, Hamilton will become the longest serving Manager since Jimmy McAlinden.

Honours
Portadown
 Irish League: 2001–02
 Irish Cup: 2004–05

Glentoran
 Irish League/IFA Premiership: 2008–09
 Irish League Cup: 2006–07, 2009–10
 County Antrim Shield: 2007–08, 2010–11

Glenavon
 Irish Cup: 2013–14, 2015–16
 Mid-Ulster Cup: 2010–11, 2017–18, 2018–19, 2020-21

References

External links 

1980 births
Living people
People from Banbridge
Association footballers from Northern Ireland
Northern Ireland international footballers
Northern Ireland B international footballers
Northern Ireland under-21 international footballers
English Football League players
Blackburn Rovers F.C. players
Rochdale A.F.C. players
Raufoss IL players
Portadown F.C. players
Glentoran F.C. players
NIFL Premiership players
Expatriate footballers in Norway
Association football forwards